Mike Haywood (born 10 November 1991) is an English rugby union player who currently plays for Aviva Premiership side Northampton Saints. His position is at hooker.

Haywood was a product of the Northampton Saints academy and was given a two-year contract with the side in 2011. In 2013, Haywood renewed his contract with the Saints.

The hooker was instrumental in some of Saints' biggest successes including starting in the 2014 Aviva Premiership final and the European Challenge Cup final, as well as featuring in the Midlands side's Aviva Premiership semi-final win over local rivals Leicester Tigers and Saints' win that ended Ulster Rugby's long time European home record.

Most recently Haywood helped Saints to secure a European Rugby Champions Cup place for the 2017/18 season as they fought off Stade Francais in the European Champions Cup play-off final. In October 2017, he was awarded Try of the week for his week 5 try against Harlequins.

References

External links
 Northampton Saints player profile
 

1991 births
Living people
English rugby union players
Rugby union hookers
Northampton Saints players
Rugby union players from Essex